Edward Hobbs (25 November 1868 – 20 July 1936) was an Australian politician.

He was born in Hampshire in England. In 1916 he was elected to the Tasmanian House of Assembly as a Nationalist member for Darwin. He joined the Country Party in 1922 and from October to November 1923 served as temporary Opposition Leader, a position he held again from October 1924 to July 1925. In 1925 he became a member of Walter Lee's "Liberal" grouping in parliament, before eventually rejoining the Nationalists. Hobbs was defeated in 1934 and died in Ulverstone in 1936.

References

1868 births
1936 deaths
Nationalist Party of Australia members of the Parliament of Tasmania
National Party of Australia members of the Parliament of Tasmania
Members of the Tasmanian House of Assembly
Leaders of the Opposition in Tasmania